Christian Malanga Musumari, commonly known as Christian Malanga (born January 2, 1983) is a Congolese politician, businessman, and former military officer. He is currently President of the United Congolese Party (UCP), a national political party he formed after his experiences in the Democratic Republic of the Congo's widely disputed parliamentary elections in 2011. In 2013, he was appointed the first ambassador of the International Religious Freedom Roundtable. On May 17, 2017, the New Zaire was officially born when President Malanga created a government in exile in Brussels.

Early life and NGO experience
Christian Malanga Musumari was born on January 2, 1983, to Christine Kapay Loyinda and Joseph Itejo Malanga in the capital city of Kinshasa. Malanga's father, Joseph Malanga was born and raised in the village of Mangai in the Bandundu Province.
His mother Christine was a local of Ngaba, Kinshasa, where Malanga's parents met as students. They settled outside of the city, where his mother worked at a local market and his father worked as a mechanic in Kinshasa proper.

In 1993, Malanga's family relocated to Swaziland as political refugees.  Malanga went to primary school at Saint Paul's Methodist Primary School in Swaziland.  In 1998, Malanga moved to Salt Lake City, Utah as a political refugee with asylum status. There he owned several small businesses until 2006, when he cofounded the DRC non-profit Africa Helpline Society. He worked directly with children at the on-site orphanage and with the organization's global outreach initiatives. Malanga used his experiences to simultaneously form his own non-governmental organization, Friends of America, during this time period.

Military service
 In June 2006, Malanga returned to the Democratic Republic of the Congo to participate in military service, and in 2007 he achieved the rank of captain in the Congolese Military. His principal duties during service included brigade morale officer and command of a training company with responsibility for approximately 235 men under his command.

Malanga Congo

After his tour of military duty ended in 2010 Malanga started his own company, Malanga Congo, which hired 250 employees in several sectors to perform public works and contracting projects. These projects included creating and maintaining water purification and bottling plants and several domestic mining operations. These businesses would prove profitable enough to provide the platform from which he launched his political career that same year.

2011 Parliamentary elections

In 2011 Malanga attended a general assembly meeting of all political opposition leaders to select a candidate to challenge the current President Joseph Kabila. When the general assembly proved to be indecisive, Malanga decided to run in the parliamentary election as an independent opposition candidate. He was detained two days before the parliamentary elections by government security forces and held for more than two weeks. Upon his release he was offered a position as National Youth President under the current government. Malanga declined the position and moved to form his own political party.

Creation of the United Congolese Party
Malanga returned to the United States in 2012 to assemble and expand his political party, the United Congolese Party (UCP). He is currently campaigning amid the Congolese diaspora in the United States, Europe and South Africa and building the leadership and membership of the UCP in preparation for the next round of national elections in the Democratic Republic of the Congo.

Ambassador to the International Religious Freedom Roundtable
On December 12, 2013, Malanga was appointed the first ever ambassador of the International Religious Freedom Roundtable, a collection of 52 NGOs and leaders in Washington DC, at a ceremony in the US Capitol Building. Malanga has been tasked by the organization to raise awareness of religious intolerance throughout Sub-Saharan Africa.

Ambassador-at-Large Kanda Bongo Man
 On April 7, 2014, Malanga appointed renowned Congolese Soukous musician Kanda Bongo Man as the United Congolese Party's first Ambassador-at-Large in a ceremony in Washington DC. Kanda's chief duty as UCP Ambassador-at-Large is to cultivate good will and friendship with other progressive African leaders.

African Leaders Programme

In 2016, with the help from the UK government, he provided his members with the opportunity for a case study in the Republic of Georgia. Mr. Malanga created a delegation of leaders who traveled to the Republic of Georgia for the African Leaders Programme, to learn how to fight against corruption, reform fiscal policy and tax systems, privatize state-owned enterprises, build a welfare system for those most in need, create a competitive education and healthcare system, and streamline procurement. The conference took place at the National Parliamentary Library of Georgia. The delegation worked with Georgian policy makers to strengthen the United Congolese Party's economic plan.

Knighted Grand Cross 

On April 29, 2017 at the Basilica, Vatican, in Rome, Italy, Mr. Malanga was knighted the Grand Cross by the order of Saint Peter and Paul. The Grand Cross knighting is reserved for heads of state only. The Archbishop of Congo and the Catholic Church have demonstrated full support in President Malanga's vision to bring democracy to the New Zaire.

Government in exile

On May 17, 2017, the New Zaire was officially born when President Malanga created a government in exile in Brussels. The ceremony hosted dignitaries from Europe and the United States for the formation of the new government. This transitional government represented the people against the rogue state of the DRC. President Malanga and the New Zaire are equipped and ready to give the Congolese people back their voice and sovereignty.

References

External links 
 United Congolese Party Official Charter

1983 births
Living people
People from Kinshasa
Democratic Republic of the Congo politicians
Democratic Republic of the Congo expatriates in the United States
21st-century Democratic Republic of the Congo people